The Aqueduct of Kavala, popularly known as the Kamares ("arches"), is a well-preserved aqueduct in the city of Kavala, Greece, and is one of the city's landmarks.

While the aqueduct is of Roman origin, the present structure built by the Ottomans in the 16th century. A Byzantine barrier wall of the early 14th century, built as part of the fortifications on the Acropolis of Kavala, probably also functioned as an aqueduct. If so, it would have been a rare example of a Byzantine aqueduct, since Byzantine cities more typically used wells and cisterns rather than either maintaining existing Roman aqueducts or building new ones. The barrier wall was replaced with the present arched aqueduct during Suleiman the Magnificent's repair and improvement of the Byzantine fortifications. Some authors date that construction to the time of the 1522 Siege of Rhodes, but a more likely date is between 1530 and 1536. As late as 1911, it supplied the city with drinking water from Mount Pangaeus.

Gallery

See also

 List of aqueducts in the Roman Empire

References

Aqueducts in Greece
Buildings and structures in Kavala
Ancient Roman buildings and structures in Greece
Byzantine architecture in Greece
Ottoman architecture in Greece
Buildings and structures completed in 1536
1536 establishments in the Ottoman Empire
Tourist attractions in Eastern Macedonia and Thrace
16th-century architecture in Greece